Roy Francis is the name of:
Roy Francis (rugby), Welsh rugby union and rugby league footballer, and coach
Roy Francis (musician), Jamaican reggae musician and record producer
Roy Francis (Royal Navy officer), naval officer and railwayman

See also